Sigar is a free software library (under the Apache License) that provides a cross-platform, cross-language programming interface to low-level information on computer hardware and operating system activity.  The library provides bindings for many popular computer languages and has been ported to over 25 different operating system/hardware combinations.  Sigar stands for System Information Gatherer And Reporter and was originally developed by Doug MacEachern, the author of the popular mod_perl module for the Apache web server.

External links
hyperic.com, SIGAR home page.
, Source Code at GitHub.

Apache Software Foundation
Computer programming
Computing platforms